The 1936 West Virginia Mountaineers football team was an American football team that represented West Virginia University as an independent during the 1936 college football season. In its third season under head coach Charles Tallman, the team compiled a 6–4 record and outscored opponents by a total of 151 to 122. The team played its home games at Mountaineer Field in Morgantown, West Virginia. Herbert Barna was the team captain.

Schedule

References

West Virginia
West Virginia Mountaineers football seasons
West Virginia Mountaineers football